The Dean of Raphoe is based at the Cathedral Church of St Eunan in Raphoe, County Donegal, in Ulster. The Deanery is within the Diocese of Derry and Raphoe within the Church of Ireland. The Deanery is currently vacant since January 2021.

List of deans
1603 John Albright
1609 Phelim O'Doghertie
1622–1630 Archibald Adair (afterwards Bishop of Killala and Achonry, 1630) 
1630–1660 Alexander Cunningham
1660/1–1661 John Leslie (afterwards Bishop of Clogher, 1661) 
1661–1670 John Wellwood
1670–1671 Ezekiel Hopkins (afterwards Bishop of Raphoe, 1671) 
1671 Thomas Buttolph
1676–1683 Capel Wiseman (afterwards Bishop of Dromore, 1683)  
1683/4–1691/2 Nathanael Wilson (afterwards Bishop of Limerick, Ardfert and Aghadoe, 1691/2) 
1691/2–1725 John Trench
1725–1742/3 William Cotterell (afterwards Bishop of Ferns and Leighlin, 1742/3)
1742/3–1744 Arthur Smyth (afterwards Dean of Derry, 1744)
1744–1756 Anthony Thompson 
1757–1776 William Barker 
1776–1776 Thomas Bray
1776–1795 James King
1795–1832 Richard Allott
1832–1873 Lord Edward Chichester
1873-1882 John Gwynn (afterwards Dean of Derry, 1882)
1882–1897 Edward Bowen (died 1897)
1897-1897 Michael Bell Cox (died within a few days of appointment; not installed)
1897–1900 Richard Bennett
1900–1903 Richard Aemilius Baillie
1903–1905 Joseph Potter
1905–1916 William George Kennedy (died December, successor appointed the following month)
1917–1940 John Pirrie Conerney
1940-1947 Thomas Henry Staunton
1947-1957 Joseph Kildare Beattie
1957-1959 Cyril James Homan 
1960-1962 John Ernest Doyle
1962–1967 George Good (afterwards Dean of Derry, 1967)
1967–1972 Stephen Arthur Cave
1972-1976 John Watson
1976-1980 Edward Alexander Moore
1980–1992 Samuel William Reede
1992–2002 Stephen White (afterwards Dean of Killaloe, 2002)
2003-2013 John Hay
2014–2021 Arthur Barrett

References

 
Diocese of Derry and Raphoe
Raphoe
Raphoe